Stinkfish may refer to several kinds of fish:
Australian stinkfish (Callionymus australis)
Bight stinkfish (Foetorepus phasis)
Common stinkfish (Foetorepus calauropomus)
Goodlad's stinkfish (Callionymus goodladi)
Gross's stinkfish (Callionymus grossi)
Queensland stinkfish (Callionymus moretonensis)

See also
The Siren Six!, an American ska band originally titled Stinkfish